Peebles (West) railway station was one of two railway stations that served the burgh of Peebles, Peeblesshire, Scotland from 1864 to 1950 on the Symington, Biggar and Broughton Railway and Peebles Railway.

History 
The station opened on 1 February 1864 by the Symington, Biggar and Broughton Railway. It opened eight months before the station of the same name. The goods yard, which had loading banks, a goods shed and a crane, was to the south. To the west was a locomotive shed with two roads. The signal box was to the north west. It was burned down in 1889 but rebuilt later in the year and rebuilt again in 1906 when the goods yard was expanded. The station closed to passengers on 5 June 1950.

References

External links 

 

Railway stations in Great Britain opened in 1864
Railway stations in Great Britain closed in 1950
1864 establishments in Scotland
1950 disestablishments in Scotland
Former Caledonian Railway stations